Blueprint is a compilation of lesser know tracks and remixes made by the British electronic music group, 808 State. The album for initially released on September 5, 2011 digitally, but was released on CD 14 days later.

Track listing 

 "Flow Coma (AFX Remix by Aphex Twin)" – 4:59
 "Pacific State (Origin)" – 5:51
 "In Yer Face (Revisited)" – 4:08
 "Cübik (Remix by Monkey Mafia)" – 5:21
 "Timebomb (808 Tape Mix)" – 4:43
 "Cobra Bora (Revisited)" – 3:46
 "Olympic (Word Production Mix)" - 4:55
 "Nimbus (Revisited)" – 4:29
 "Nephatiti"– 4:48
 "Firecracker (Edit)" – 3:59
 "Plan 9 (Radio Edit by Trevor Horn)" – 3:42
 "Lopez (Radio Mix by Brian Eno)" – 3:50
 "Lemonsoul" –3:21
 "Qmart" – 4:58
 "606 (Revisited)" – 5:07
 "Spanish Ice" – 4:03
 "Metaluna/Compulsion (Revisited)" – 4:22

References 

808 State albums
2011 albums
Electronica albums